Sumner High School and Sumner Auditorium, now the Sumner Town Hall is a historic high school building and auditorium in Sumner, Georgia, Worth County, Georgia. It was added to the National Register of Historic Places on September 27, 1996. The buildings are located at 716 Walnut Street. The auditorium is used as Sumner's Town Hall. The old school building is used by Worth County.

See also
National Register of Historic Places listings in Worth County, Georgia

References

External links
Town of Sumner website (includes a photo tour of the auditorium / town hall building)

High schools in Georgia (U.S. state)
Education in Worth County, Georgia
School buildings on the National Register of Historic Places in Georgia (U.S. state)
School buildings completed in 1938
City halls in Georgia (U.S. state)
National Register of Historic Places in Worth County, Georgia